Redi can refer to:


People

Given name
 Redi Halilaj (born 1989), Albanian cyclist
 Redi Jupi (born 1974), Albanian footballer
 Redi Tlhabi, South African journalist, producer, author and radio presenter
 Redi Vogli (born 1987), Albanian basketball player

Surname
 Francesco Redi (1626–1697), Italian scientist
 Gino Redi (1908–1962), Italian composer
 Tommaso Redi (1665–1726), Italian painter who was active during the late-Baroque

Other names
 Raidi (born 1938), Tibetan politician known in Chinese as Rèdì

Other uses
 REDi, American musical group
 Redi (crater), Martian impact crater
 Redi (shopping centre), a shopping mall in Helsinki, Finland
 Redi, Maharashtra, Indian village
 Redi Port
 Redi Award, international science award in toxinology
 Thomson Reuters REDI, execution management system platform
 Redi, a village in Maharashtra state in India; known for the Ganapati Temple

See also
Redis (disambiguation)